Gennadiy Mikhailovich Agapov (5 December 1933 – 22 July 1999) was a Soviet Russian race walker. Agapov held the unofficial world records in both the 20 km walk and the 50 km walk and placed second in the 50 km walk at the 1966 European Championships.

Career
Agapov was Soviet champion in the 50 km walk in 1962, 1965 and 1966. He competed in the Olympic Games in Tokyo 1964 and Mexico City 1968, both times in the 50 km walk. He placed 12th in Tokyo and failed to finish in Mexico City. At the 1966 European Championships in Budapest he won silver in the 50 km walk, behind defending champion Abdon Pamich of Italy. Between 1965 and 1972, Agapov set unofficial world records in the 20 km walk, the 50 km walk and the 20,000 m track walk (the International Association of Athletics Federations did not ratify official records at the time); with his time of 3:55:36, he was the first man to walk 50 kilometres in less than four hours.

References

1933 births
1999 deaths
Sportspeople from Kaliningrad
Soviet male racewalkers
Russian male racewalkers
Athletes (track and field) at the 1964 Summer Olympics
Athletes (track and field) at the 1968 Summer Olympics
Olympic athletes of the Soviet Union
World record setters in athletics (track and field)
European Athletics Championships medalists